Charles James Barclay (born 8 September 1843) was a United States Navy officer.

Biography
Barclay was born in Philadelphia, and entered the U.S. Naval Academy on 21 September 1860 with the rank of acting midshipman, graduating on 6 October 1863, as an acting ensign.

He rose through the ranks post-war, being promoted to master on 10 May 1866, to lieutenant on 21 February 1867, to lieutenant commander on 12 March 1868, to commander on 25 November 1881, and to captain on 1 October 1896.

Barclay recommissioned the monitor  at Norfolk on 2 October 1897, commanding her during the Spanish–American War, and taking part in the bombardment of San Juan, Puerto Rico, on 12 May 1898, and then serving on blockade duty. He was still in command of her in 1899.

He was commandant of the Naval War Academy from 1900, and was captain of the Navy Yards at Boston and then at Puget Sound.

Barclay  was promoted to rear admiral on 20 November 1903, and retired in 1905.

References

1843 births
Year of death missing
20th-century deaths
United States Navy rear admirals (lower half)
United States Naval Academy alumni
Union Navy officers